The Natural History Museum of Nepal is located near the World Heritage Site of Swayambhunath. The museum was established in 1975. Since then the museum has collected 50,000 specimens of Nepal’s flora and fauna.

Journal of Natural History Museum
The Natural History Museum of Nepal has  been publishing a journal annually since 1977. The journal, entitled the Journal of Natural History Museum, is the oldest journal on nature in Nepal. The museum has also published numerous books and field guides on Nepal's wildlife.

NHM and CITES
The museum is the scientific authority in fauna for CITES (Convention on International Trade in Endangered Species of Wild Fauna and Flora) in Nepal. It conducts training programs on CITES-related issues for teachers, students, and people working in Nepal’s conservation sector.

Specimens

The museum's huge specimen collection is a treasure trove of Nepal's bio-diversity. There are 14,843 specimens of butterflies and moths; 4,142 of beetles; 1,464 of dragonflies and 1,604 of other insects. It also has six specimens of lower chordates, 890 of fish, 107 amphibians specimens, 390 of reptiles and 1,194 of birds. The museum's mammalian specimens total 225, and it also has 22 specimens of skeletons, besides 964 fossils and animal body parts. The museum also houses 107 models of plastic-clay and 74 of rock and minerals. Equally impressive is the museum's botanical and mycological collection: algae (124), fungi and mushrooms (2,320), lichens (61), bryophytes (1,124), pteridophytes (507), gymnosperms (163), and angiosperms (5,034).

The museum also has a specimen of the spiny babbler, Nepal's only endemic bird species. A specimen of the golden pheasant, an exotic bird from China, is also on display.

Also on display is a specimen of the Atlas moth, the largest moth species in the world.

Specimens of extinct species

The museum is now the only place to see a specimen of the mouse deer (Indian chevrotain), which is believed to be extinct in Nepal.

Strange specimens
The museum has some bizarre specimens, among them an eight-legged embryo of a goat, a four-legged chick, and a two-headed snake.

Fossils

The museum also some relics from the country's prehistoric times. There is a fossilized skull of the Archidiskodon, a species of elephant that roamed the  Sivalik Hills of Nepal. Another ancient specimen is the molar teeth of Sivapithecus, a hominoid. The skull and the teeth are believed to be from around 3 million years and 8-10 million years old respectively.

Rare and Threatened Species

The museum also has specimens of rare and threatened species of fauna. Gaint hornbill ,Green -breasted Pitta, Pelican, Flamingo, Painted Stroke, Black -Crowned Night Heron, Brown-wood owl,Crested Serpent Eagle are some of these bird specimen. Endangered species such as Panthera tigrina and Manis pentadactyla (Chinese pangolin ) are also kept here.

See also
List of museums in Nepal

References

Natural history museums
Museums in Kathmandu
1975 establishments in Nepal